F. australis  may refer to:
 Fabrosaurus australis, a herbivorous dinosaur species which lived during the Early Jurassic
 Flindersia australis, the crows ash or Australian teak, a rainforest tree species found in Australia
 Fontainea australis, Australian subtropical plant

See also
 Australis (disambiguation)